Icy Demons is an experimental music project started by Bablicon's Griffin Rodriguez (credited as Blue Hawaii) and Man Man / Need New Body's Christopher Powell (Pow Pow).  A project of various Chicago musicians, they have released three albums, Fight Back! on the Elephant 6-associated label Cloud Recordings,
Tears of a Clone on Eastern Developments Music, and Miami Ice on the label started by Rodriguez and Powell called Obey Your Brain.

Influences and style

Demons can be seen as a continuation of the Canterbury Scene which involved acts like Soft Machine and Robert Wyatt. They do however move forward into new ground by mixing this Canterbury style with a noticeable Krautrock influence, especially that of Can. Some melodic lines and rhythmic patterns are strongly reminiscent of Frank Zappa's compositions. Other similar acts include Aksak Maboul, Pit er Pat, Pop-off Tuesday, Lightning Bolt, and Cheer Accident.

Discography
 (2004) Fight Back! 
 (2005) Jump Off 7" b/w Pit Er Pat  
 (2006) Tears of a Clone 
 (2008) Miami Ice

Members (past and present)
 Griffin Rodriguez a.k.a. Blue Hawaii a.k.a. Tombstone G 
 Chris Powell a.k.a. Pow Pow a.k.a. Rick Daggers 
 The Diminisher a.k.a. Da Minister a.k.a. Thousand Rabbits Running 
 Moylando Calrissian 
 Dylan Ryan a.k.a. Ilcativo 
 Chris Kalis a.k.a. Smart Cousin 
 TA-FREAK-YA 
 Ali Hawkbar 
 Young Master Schneider
 Yo!Hanan
 Monsieur Jeri
 Tim Conley a.k.a. MAST

Shape Shoppe
Blue Hawaii also runs a recording studio in Chicago's south loop called the Shape Shoppe. Besides Bablicon and Icy Demons, 
he has engineered and mixed many local and regional bands' records. Most recently he has worked with Beirut to record the album March of the Zapotec and a forthcoming LP with rapper Count Bass D.

References

External links
Icy Demons official website
Icy Demons on The Leaf Label

The Elephant 6 Recording Company artists
American experimental musical groups
Polyvinyl Record Co. artists